Fina de Calderón (August 21, 1927 Madrid- January 12, 2010 Madrid) was a Spanish writer, poet, songwriter, and musician.

Her song  "Caracola" ("Conch") was the Spanish entry in the Eurovision Song Contest 1964, performed by Los TNT.

Life
She grew up in France.
As a youth, she studied violin and composed her first poems.
She moved to Toledo, and was owner of Cigarral del Ángel.

Family
She married Fernando Calderon Gutierrez, Marquis of Mozobamba del Pozo, and they had three children, José Rafael, Mariola and Giovanna.

Works
Fuego, grito, luna (Fire, cry, moon), (theater)
 (The steps do not come back) (Memoir)

PoetryLa cicatriz de arena (The scar of sand) (poetry)Pluriels (Plurales) Fugger Libros, SIAL Ediciones, 2006,  (poems bilingual French / Spanish)

Songs
"En Roma (Rome)"
"La otra mitad (The other half)"
"Pouvoir" (song by Édith Piaf)
"Nous de Paris" (song by Maurice Chevalier)
"Caracola (Conch)"
"Primer plano (Foreground)" (song by Víctor Manuel in 1966)
 (My festival-goers songs of the 60's)"

DancesCancela (ballet)El Greco'' (ballet)

References

Spanish poets
1927 births
2010 deaths
Spanish songwriters
20th-century Spanish musicians